The Dry River is a river in the Northern Territory of Australia.

The headwaters of the river rise under Tinker Hill in the Fitzgerald Range just north of Birrimba Station homestead. The river floes in a north easterly direction moving across the mostly uninhabited plains through Dry River Station and then discharges into the King River, of which it is a tributary, and eventually flows into the Timor Sea.

The only tributary of the Dry River is Forrest Creek.

The eastern parts of the catchment are bounded by the Sturt Plateau. Upper parts of the river have been described as weakly developed.

Western Creek was once a major tributary of the Dry River but it now flows into Elsey Creek. There are a number of waterholes which are permanent on the black soil plains of the river.

See also

References

Rivers of the Northern Territory